The 1962 Idaho Vandals football team represented the University of Idaho in the 1962 NCAA University Division football season. The Vandals were led by first-year head coach Dee Andros and were an independent in the NCAA's University Division. Home games were played on campus at Neale Stadium in Moscow, with one in Boise at old Bronco Stadium at Boise Junior College.

The Vandals suffered an eighth straight loss in the Battle of the Palouse with neighbor Washington State, falling 14–22 in the wet snow at Neale Stadium in Moscow in the season finale on November 17. The rivalry game with Montana for the Little Brown Stein was played in Missoula and won by the Grizzlies.

Although Idaho was a charter member of the new Big Sky Conference the following year, it did not participate in football until 1965, and was an independent from 1959 through 1964.

This was the last Vandal football season with only nine games scheduled. The following year had ten, but the last was canceled due to the assassination of President Kennedy. Idaho first played a ten-game schedule in 1959, and it resumed in 1964.

Andros, the line coach at Illinois, played and coached under Bud Wilkinson at Oklahoma after serving in the U.S. Marine Corps in World War II. He was named head coach at age 37 in February and took over for Skip Stahley, who stepped down after eight seasons and remained as athletic director.  Andros' starting annual salary at Idaho was just under $12,500.

Schedule

All-Coast
No Vandals made the All-Coast team or the second team; honorable mention was guard Denny Almquist.

References

External links
Gem of the Mountains: 1963 University of Idaho yearbook – 1962 football season
Go Mighty Vandals – 1962 football season
Official game program: Idaho at Utah – October 27, 1962
Idaho Argonaut – student newspaper – 1962 editions

Idaho
Idaho Vandals football seasons
Idaho Vandals football